Leptotes bohnkiana is a species of orchid endemic to Brazil (Bahia).

References

External links 

bohnkiana
Endemic orchids of Brazil
Orchids of Bahia